Edward Charles Wickham was Dean of Lincoln from 1894 to 1910. Born on 7 December 1834, he was educated at Winchester and New College, Oxford, being appointed a Probationary Scholar at 17 and eventually rose to be a Fellow. He was Headmaster of Wellington College from 1873 to 1893 before his appointment to the Deanery. He died on 18 August 1910.

Notes

1834 births
Alumni of New College, Oxford
People educated at Winchester College
Fellows of New College, Oxford
Heads of schools in England
Deans of Lincoln
1910 deaths